Sunnyside and Sunny Side may refer to:

Entertainment
 Sunnyside (film), a 1919 film by Charlie Chaplin
 Sunnyside (novel), a 2009 novel by Glen David Gold
 Sunnyside (Canadian TV series), a Canadian sketch comedy TV series
 Sunnyside (American TV series), an American TV series that premiered in September 2019
 Sunnyside Records, a New York City jazz record label
 The Sunny Side, a collection of short stories and essays by A. A. Milne

Places

Australia
 Sunnyside, Queensland, a rural locality
 Sunnyside, South Australia, a hamlet and semi-rural locality
 Sunnyside, Tasmania, a rural locality

Canada
 Sunnyside, Calgary, Alberta, a neighborhood
 Sunnyside, Surrey, British Columbia, a neighborhood of South Surrey
 Sunnyside, Newfoundland and Labrador, Canada, a town
 Sunnyside, Toronto, Ontario, Canada, a lakefront district
 Sunnyside Amusement Park (1922-1955) a popular lakeside attraction that is now a beach and park that includes the Sunnyside Bathing Pavilion.

United Kingdom
 Sunnyside (Luss), a listed building in Scotland
 Sunnyside (Hitchin), Hertfordshire, England, a residential area of the market town of Hitchin

United States
 Sunnyside, Arizona, a populated place
 Sunnyside, Fresno County, California, a census-designated place
 Sunnyside, Placer County, California, an unincorporated community
 Sunnyside, San Francisco, California, a neighborhood
 Sunnyside, Denver, Colorado, a neighborhood
 Sunnyside, Florida, an unincorporated community
 Sunny Side, Georgia, a city
 Sunnyside, Georgia, a census-designated place
 Sunnyside (East Chicago), Illinois, a neighborhood
 Sunnyside, Kentucky, an unincorporated community
 Sunny Side, Maryland, an unincorporated community
 Sunnyside (Aquasco, Maryland), a home on the National Register of Historic Places (NRHP)
 Sunnyside Township, Wilkin County, Minnesota
 Sunnyside, Mississippi, an unincorporated community
 Sunnyside, Nevada, an unincorporated community
 Sunnyside, New Jersey
 Sunnyside, Queens, New York, a neighborhood of New York City
 Sunnyside (Richfield Springs, New York), a home listed on the NRHP
 Sunnyside, Staten Island, New York, a neighborhood
 Sunnyside (Tarrytown, New York)
 Sunnyside (Wendell, North Carolina), a home listed on the NRHP
 Sunnyside, Clackamas County, Oregon, a census-designated place
 Sunnyside, Portland, Oregon, a neighborhood
 Sunnyside, Umatilla County, Oregon, a community
 Sunnyside (Edisto Island, South Carolina), a plantation house listed on the NRHP
 Sunnyside (Greenwood, South Carolina), a home listed on the NRHP
 Sunnyside Township, Pennington County, South Dakota
 Sunnyside (Nashville, Tennessee), a mansion listed on the NRHP
 Sunnyside, Castro County, Texas, an unincorporated community
 Sunnyside, Houston, Texas, a neighborhood
 Sunnyside, Menard County, Texas, a ghost town
 Sunny Side, Waller County, Texas, an unincorporated community
 Sunnyside, Utah, a former city, merged with the neighboring city of East Carbon
 Sunny Side, Virginia, an unincorporated community
 Sunnyside (Charlottesville, Virginia), a home listed on the NRHP
 Sunnyside (Clarksville, Virginia), a plantation house listed on the NRHP
 Sunnyside (Heathsville, Virginia), a plantation house listed on the NRHP
 Sunnyside (Lexington, Virginia), a home listed on the NRHP
 Sunnyside (Newsoms, Virginia), a plantation house and complex listed on the NRHP
 Sunnyside (Washington, Virginia), a farm complex and national historic district listed on the NRHP
 Sunnyside, Washington, a city
 Sunnyside, Fayette County, West Virginia, an unincorporated community
 Sunnyside, Tyler County, West Virginia, an unincorporated community
 Sunnyside, Wisconsin, an unincorporated community

Elsewhere
 Sunnyside, Pretoria, South Africa, a suburb of Pretoria

Stations
 Coatbridge Sunnyside railway station, in Coatbridge, North Lanarkshire, Scotland
 Sunnyside railway station, New South Wales, Australia
 Sunnyside station (Calgary), in Calgary, Alberta, Canada
 Sunnyside station (Toronto), in Toronto, Ontario, Canada
 Sunnyside station (New York City), a proposed station in Queens, New York, United States
 Sunnyside Yard, an Amtrak-owned coach yard in Queens, New York, United States

Other uses
 Sunnyside High School (disambiguation)
 Sunnyside Amusement Park, in Toronto, Ontario, Canada
 Sunnyside Hospital, a mental hospital in Christchurch, New Zealand
 Sunnyside Plantation, a cotton plantation in Arkansas, United States
 Sunnyside, Kangaroo Point, a heritage-listed house in Brisbane, Queensland, Australia

See also
 Sunnyside–Tahoe City, California
 Sunnyside–Central Terrace Historic District, Winston-Salem, North Carolina
 Sunny (disambiguation)
 Sunnyside Farm (disambiguation)